Misaki (みさき, ミサキ) is a popular feminine Japanese given name which can also be used as a surname.

Possible writings
Misaki can be written using different kanji characters and can mean:

As a given name 
美咲 "beautiful, blossom"
美沙紀 "beautiful, sand, chronicle"
海咲 “ocean, blossom”
The given name can also be written in hiragana or katakana.

As a surname 
岬 "cape/promontory"
三崎 "three promontories"
三咲 "three blossoms"
美崎 "beautiful promontory"
 見崎 "to look, promontory"

People with the given name 
, Japanese professional tennis player
, Japanese fencer
, Japanese actress, model, and idol
, Japanese idol, enka singer, and a member of Jpop group AKB48
, Japanese artist
, Japanese squash player
, Japanese mixed martial artist
, Japanese rower
, Japanese voice actress and singer
, Japanese badminton player
, Japanese actress and tarento
, Japanese table tennis player
Misaki Nakayama (born 2002), Japanese professional footballer
, Japanese professional wrestler
, Japanese long-distance runner
, Japanese speed skater
, Japanese weightlifter
, Japanese former field hockey player 
, Japanese voice actress
, Japanese football player
, Japanese voice actress
, Japanese swimmer

People with the surname 
, Japanese actress 
, Japanese sport shooter
, Japanese manga artist
, Japanese professional mixed martial arts fighter and former judoka
, Japanese racing driver
, Japanese football player
, Japanese football player

Characters with the given name 
Misaki Jurai (美砂樹), a character in the anime Tenchi Muyo!
Misaki Suzuhara (みさき), the main character in the anime Angelic Layer
Misaki Takahashi (美咲), main character in the anime Junjou Romantica
Misaki Nakahara (中原 岬), character of Welcome to the N.H.K.
Misaki Harada (美咲), a character in the anime Gakuen Alice
Misaki Ayuzawa, the main character of the anime/manga Maid Sama!
Misaki Kureha, the main character in the anime Divergence Eve and Misaki Chronicles
Misaki Kirihara (霧原 未咲), character of Darker than Black
Misaki Asou, one of the protagonists in the video game Fatal Frame 4
Misaki Aoyagi, a character in the manga Loveless
Misaki Oga, a character in the anime Beelzebub
Mei Misaki, a character in the anime Another
Misaki Yata (美咲), a character in the anime K Project
Misaki Shokuhō (食蜂操祈), a character of A Certain Magical Index
Misaki Kamiigusa (上井草 美咲), a character of Sakura-sō no Pet na Kanojo
 Misaki Shouta, a character in the manga Hana No Mizo Shiru
 Misaki Okusawa, a character from the BanG Dream! media franchise

Characters with the surname 
Taro Misaki (岬), a character in the manga, anime, and video game series Captain Tsubasa
 Hana Misaki (岬 話), a manager of Jōzenji High in Haikyū!!
Ryo Misaki (岬), a minor character in the anime Angelic Layer
Shiki Misaki, a protagonist in the video game The World Ends with You

References

Japanese feminine given names
Japanese-language surnames